Gerry W. Thompson is an American Magic: The Gathering player.  His career accomplishments include two Grand Prix victories, Pro Tour Top 8 at Montreal in 2013, Bilbao in 2018, and a Pro Tour win at Nashville in 2017. He is also known for his repeated success at the StarCityGames tournament series. His hometown is Elk River, Minnesota.

Achievements

Top 8 appearances

References

American Magic: The Gathering players
Living people
1984 births